The 2011 Golden Spin of Zagreb was the 44th edition of an annual senior-level international figure skating competition held in Zagreb, Croatia. It was held at the Dom Sportova on December 8–11, 2011. Skaters competed in the disciplines of men's singles, ladies' singles, pair skating, and ice dancing on the senior level.

Medalists

Results

Men

Ladies

Pairs

Ice dancing

References

External links
 Results
 Official website 

Golden Spin of Zagreb
Golden Spin Of Zagreb, 2011
Golden Spin Of Zagreb, 2011